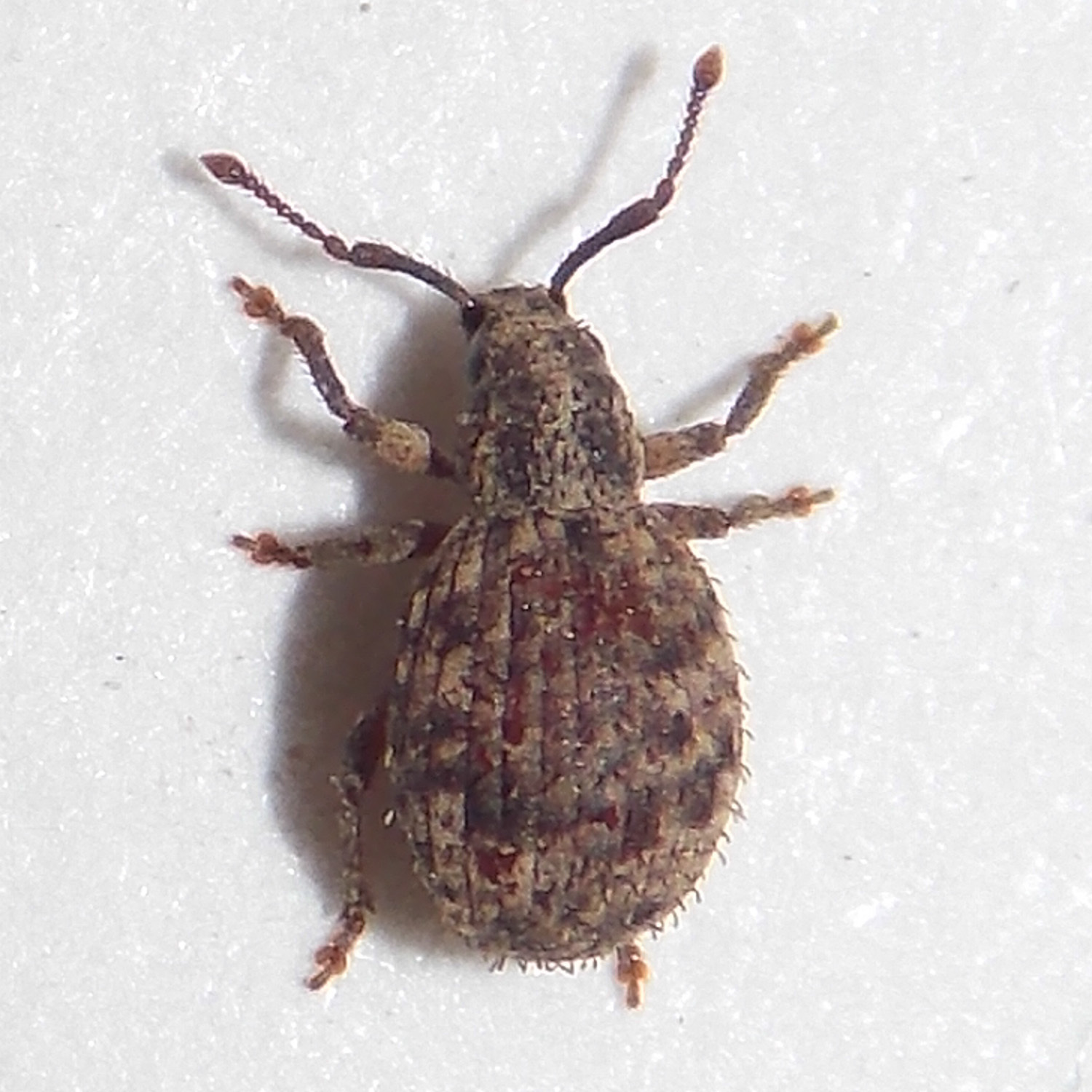

Scientific classification
- Domain: Eukaryota
- Kingdom: Animalia
- Phylum: Arthropoda
- Class: Insecta
- Order: Coleoptera
- Suborder: Polyphaga
- Infraorder: Cucujiformia
- Family: Curculionidae
- Genus: Myosides
- Species: M. seriehispidus

Binomial name
- Myosides seriehispidus Roelofs, 1873

= Myosides seriehispidus =

Species of beetle

Myosides seriehispidus is a species of weevil native to Asia. It is triploid and reproduces via parthenogenesis. Since the year 2000 it has been found in United States and Canada.
